Xovos is a district of Sirdaryo Region in Uzbekistan. The capital lies at the town Xovos. The district consists of 2 urban-type settlements (Xovos, Gulbahor) and 11 rural communities (incl. Qahramon).

References

Districts of Uzbekistan
Sirdaryo Region